Alan Dale (May 14, 1861 - May 21, 1928) was an influential British theatre critic, playwright and book author of the late Victorian and early 20th Century eras. He was born Alfred J. Cohen in Birmingham England. He arrived in New York in 1887 and became a drama critic for several New York papers i.e., New York Evening World, New York Journal and the New York American. His reviews of plays were often negative but helped sell a lot of William Randolph Hearst's newspapers. The theatre world despised Dale for his acid reviews.

His spouse was Carrie L. Frost and they had at least one child Margaret (or Marjorie).

Dale died aboard train while traveling from Plymouth to Birmingham. He had undergone several operations previously after health problems.


See also
William Ernest Henley
George Bernard Shaw
Alexander Woolcott
Heywood Broun
Dorothy Parker

Selected bibliography

Novels

Jonathan's Home (1885)
A Marriage Below Zero (1889)
An Eerie He and She (1889)
An Old Maid Kindled (1890)
Miss Innocence (1890)
Conscience on Ice (1892)
My Footlight Husband (1893)
A Moral Busybody (1894)

Other works
Familiar Chats with Queens of the Stage (1880)

References

External links

 
 

1861 births
1928 deaths
Writers from Birmingham, West Midlands
English critics
19th-century British dramatists and playwrights
20th-century English dramatists and playwrights
English male dramatists and playwrights
19th-century English male writers
20th-century English male writers
English male non-fiction writers